The Ford Transit is a family of light commercial vehicles manufactured by the Ford Motor Company since 1965, primarily as a cargo van, but also available in other configurations including a large passenger van (marketed as the Ford Tourneo in some markets since 1995), cutaway van chassis, and a pickup truck. The vehicle is also known as the Ford T-Series (T-150, T-250, T-350), a nomenclature shared with Ford's other light commercial vehicles, the Ford F-Series trucks, and the Ford E-Series chassis. , 8 million Transit vans have been sold, making it the third best-selling van of all time and has been produced across four basic platform generations (debuting in 1965, 1986, 2000, and 2013 respectively), with various "facelift" versions of each.

The first product of the merged Ford of Europe, the Transit was originally marketed in Western Europe and Australia. By the end of the twentieth century, it was marketed nearly globally with the exception of North America until 2013 when it replaced the Ford E-Series van. Upon its introduction in North America, the Transit quickly became the best-selling van of any type in the United States, minivan sales included.

That mirrors the success the Transit has achieved in Europe, where it has been the best-selling light commercial vehicle for forty years, and in some countries the term "Transit" has passed into common usage as a generic trademark applying to any light commercial van in the Transit's size bracket.

Taunus Transit (1953) 

Predecessor of the British and German-built Transit, the first production Ford to wear the "Transit" badge was a van built in Ford's Cologne plant in Germany. It was introduced in 1953 as FK 1000 (carrying 1,000 kg) with a 1.2-litre inline-four engine from the contemporary Taunus. In 1955 the engine capacity was enlarged to 1.5 litres. From 1961, this vehicle was called the Ford Taunus Transit. Production of this model ceased in 1965.

Brief historical view 

On 9 May 1945, the day after the unconditional surrender of the German Wehrmacht in the Second World War, production at the German Ford-Werke AG in Cologne (Köln) resumed. Because the production of civilian cars in the occupied zone was reserved for the British (for instance for Ford of Britain), Ford-Werke AG limited itself to the production of trucks (until 1948). Those trucks based on the slightly modified war models V 3000 S, B 3000 S und V 3000 A as they were already produced before and during the Second World War in the Ford production facilities in the Third Reich. Those trucks were now called "Rhein" and "Ruhr".

At that time neither Ford of Britain nor Ford Werke AG were 100% subsidiaries of Ford Motor Company in Detroit and before the Second World War each company had its own more or less protected market. Until Germany declared war on the US in December 1941, almost half of the shares of the Ford-Werke AG were in German hands, as well as its production sites were managed by the Reich Commissioner for the Treatment of Hostile Property - Johannes Krohn. Just as Ford also had to comply with the type restrictions of the Schell-Plan, which were introduced in March 1939 in anticipation of the war.

After the war, several economical boundaries were abolished and local markets did not exist anymore in the same way that they existed before. With this, Ford of Britain and Ford-Werke AG suddenly became more competitive on the whole European Continent than local market subsidiaries of their parent company in Detroit.

In 1951 Ford Werke AG launched the FK commercial vehicle series, FK standing for Ford Köln, with different-sized vehicles (FK2000 with 2 tons payload, FK3000 with 3 tons payload, FK3500 with 3,5 tons payload, etc.). The FK series was successor of the "Rhein" and "Ruhr" trucks. In 1953, the FK series were rounded off with the light delivery van FK1000/FK1250 (1ton/1,25tons payload), in competition to the Volkswagen Type 2 VW Bus, the DKW Type F89L Schnellaster or the Vidal & Sohn Tempo Matador.

As usual in the Anglo-Saxon countries in those days, Ford's marketing experts attached more importance to the model/series designation than to the "Ford" label as a brand. Rumors that Ford banned the German Ford-Werke AG from using the Ford logo and instead introduced the Taunus brand are untenable. Also most British Ford products had no Ford emblem.

The commercial vehicles produced at Ford-Werke AG were marketed with the FK logo, while the passenger cars produced from 1948 onwards were offered under the name Taunus referring to the re-produced pre-war model Ford Taunus G93A.

Due to continental European habits, the original series and model designations "FK" and Taunus mutated into real brands, each with its own emblem and different models, comparable with Daimler Benz Mercedes models or General Motors Opel models.
The FK emblem consists of two slightly overlapping ovals with the "F" from the well-known Ford emblem in the first and a "K" in the same font in the second oval. The Taunus emblem first depicted the Cologne Cathedral; from 1953 on until its discontinuation in 1967, Cologne's city flag inspired the Taunus emblem.

In 1961, Ford discontinued the entire truck production in Germany and took the FK brand off the market due to serious defects and therefore strongly decreasing demand.
The van FK1000/FK1250, not affected by these defects due to its completely different construction-design, continued to sell well and was now offered under the successful Taunus brand with the model name Transit in addition to the cars Taunus 12M/15M and the Taunus 17M. A comparable program to Volkswagen, that offered its vehicles VW Beetle, VW 1500 and VW Bus the same way on the continental European market. The "new" Transit Taunus van was now labelled with the Transit model name (instead of the FK logo) in big chrome letters and a big "Taunus" emblem as well as a small Taunus lettering which was also mounted on the back of the vehicle. New, however, was a small Ford logo underneath the right B-column.

From 1957 onwards, with the launch of the Ford Thames 400E by Ford of Britain, the situation arose that Ford, together with the FK1000/FK1250 by Ford Werke AG, was now present on the continental European markets with two competing products. For example, the British Ford Thames 400E was also assembled and improved as a left-hand drive version in the Ford assembly plants in Copenhagen, Denmark, as well as the German FK1000 was assembled in Azambuja, Portugal, too. In the French, Spanish, Italian, Swiss, Benelux and Scandinavian markets, both products were found. This turned out to be disadvantageous and cost-intensive especially after the fall of various trade barriers within the newly founded EEC.

For this reason, such a situation with internal competition and parallel developments was very unsatisfactory for the Ford headquarters in Detroit. The aim was to not only standardize the vehicle production (world car), but also merge the company structures in Europe.
Under parent's dictate, Ford of Britain and Ford-Werke AG started the "Redcap-Project" in the commercial vehicle sector in 1963, from which the Ford Transit was launched in 1965, based on a new unified platform.

Two years later in 1967, Ford of Britain and Ford-Werke AG merged to Ford of Europe with the headquarters in Cologne, Germany. The brand Taunus was taken off the market. Ford forced the standardization of platforms and even model-names overall European market under the Ford brand and logo. After the Ford Transit in 1965, a second unified platform (Ford Escort) was launched in 1967. With the discontinuation of the Ford Zephyr (British) and Ford P7 (German) 1972 all Ford platforms for the European market are unified. Since 1994 (discontinuation of the Ford Granada name) even the Ford model-names are the same for the European market.

Naming system 
The German vehicle was not widely exported, and the "Mark 1" tag has commonly been applied, retrospectively, to the 1965 to 1978 British model (see below). Whilst there have only been four basic platforms since 1965, the various facelifts and upgrades over the years have been referred to using a conflicting range of "Mark" numbers, with some sources counting a facelift as a new "Mark", some not. Ford's own historical look back at Transit production, published for the launch of the 1994 model, avoids the issue by referring to generations of Transit by years produced. This article attempts to make mention of all the common naming systems.

First generation (1965) 

The first generation Transit, or the Transit Mark I in the United Kingdom, was introduced in October 1965, taking over directly from the Thames 400E.  This generation had the longest production run of any Transit to date, staying largely unaltered for 12 years until the major facelift of 1977, with overall production lasting for over 20 years before finally being replaced by the all-new VE6 platform in 1986.

The van was produced initially at Ford's Langley facility in Berkshire, England (a former Second World War aircraft factory which had produced Hawker Hurricane fighters), but demand outstripped the capability of the plant, and production was moved to Southampton until closure in 2013 in favour of the factory at İzmit, Turkey.

Transits were also produced in Ford's Genk factory in Belgium and also Turkey. Transits were produced in Amsterdam for the local market from the mid-1970s until the end of 1981. This factory had ample capacity, since the Ford Transcontinental produced there had little success (total production 8000 in 6 years). Although the Transit sold well in the Netherlands, it was not enough to save the factory, which closed in December 1981.

The Transit was introduced to replace the Ford Thames 400E, a small mid-engined forward control van noted for its narrow track which was in competition with similar-looking but larger vehicles from the BMC J4 and J2 vans and Rootes Group's Commer PB ranges. In a UK market segment then dominated by the Bedford CA, Ford's Thames competitor, because of its restricted load area, failed to attract fleet users in sufficient numbers. Ford switched to a front-engined configuration, as did Bedford with their well-regarded CA series vans in the 1950s. Henry Ford II's revolutionary step was to combine the engineering efforts of Ford of Britain and Ford of Germany to create a prototype for the Ford of Europe of today—previously the two subsidiaries had avoided competing in one another's domestic markets but had been direct competitors in other European markets.

The Transit was a departure from the European commercial vehicles of the day with its American-inspired styling—its broad track gave it a huge advantage in carrying capacity over comparable vehicles of the day. Most of the Transit's mechanical components were adapted from Ford's car range of the time. Another key to the Transit's success was the sheer number of different body styles: panel vans in long and short wheelbase forms, pick-up truck, minibuses, crew-cabs to name but a few.

The engines used in the UK were the Essex V4 for the petrol-engined version in 1.7 L and 2.0 L capacities. By using relatively short V-4 engines Ford were able to minimise the additional length necessitated to place the engine ahead of the driver. Another popular development under the bonnet was the equipping of the van with an alternator at time when the UK market competitors expected buyers to be content with a dynamo. A  diesel engine sourced from Perkins was also offered. As this engine was too long to fit under the Transit's stubby nose, the diesel version featured a longer bonnet - which became nicknamed as the "pig snout". The underpowered Perkins proved unpopular, and was replaced by Ford's own York unit in 1972. For mainland Europe the Transit had the German Ford Taunus V4 engine in Cologne 1.3, 1.5, and 1.7- or Essex 2.0-litre versions. The diesel version's long nose front was also used to accommodate the Ford 3.0 L Ford Essex V6 engine (UK) for high performance applications such as vans supplied to police and ambulance services. In Australia, in 1973, to supplement the two Essex V4 engines that were available the Transit was released with the long-nose diesel front used to accommodate an inline 6-cylinder engine derived from the Ford Falcon.

The Metropolitan Police reported on this vehicle in 1972 via a Scotland Yard spokesman that "Ford Transits are used in 95 per cent of bank raids. With the performance of a car, and space for 1.75 tonnes of loot, the Transit is proving to be the perfect getaway vehicle", describing it as "Britain's most wanted van".

The adoption of a front beam axle in place of a system incorporating independent front suspension that had featured on its UK predecessor might have been seen as a backward step by some, but on the road commentators felt that the Transit's wider track and longer wheelbase more than compensated for the apparent step backwards represented by Ford's suspension choices. Drivers appreciated the elimination of the excessive noise, smell and cabin heat that resulted from placing the driver above or adjacent to the engine compartment in the Thames 400E and other forward control light vans of the 1950s and early 1960s.

The Transit was also assembled in South Africa between 1967 and 1974, the last Transit to be sold in that country until 2013, when a fully imported model was introduced.

Facelift (1977) 

In August 1977, a facelifted version—codenamed within Ford as the "Transit "—but usually referred to as the Transit Mark II, debuted with a restyled, longer nose section which could now properly accommodate an in-line engine in place of the Essex and Cologne V4s - therefore the Pinto engine from the Cortina became the Transit's dominant power unit. Many fleet owners experienced premature camshaft wear in early Pinto units in the Cortina and for two years the Transit 75 was available with the 1.6 L Ford Kent cross-flow engine. High-performance versions intended for police or ambulance service used the 3.0 L V6 version of the Essex engine, Australian variants had 4.1 L (250 cu in) inline 6-cylinder engines, from September 1978. The  3.0 was also available in some heavier duty models. The new frontal styling brought the Transit back into line with the rest of Ford of Europe's passenger car range of the period with square headlamps and the black louvred grille, although the rear styling remained unaltered. The rather spartan metal dashboard of the Mk1 with its single instrument binnacle was replaced with a full width plastic fascia with a more comprehensive instrument cluster and switchgear taken from the Taunus/Cortina Mk.4.

In 1984, the York diesel engine was redesigned into the 2.5 L "DI" (direct injection) unit. At this time this generation received a minor facelift including a grey plastic front grille with integrated headlamp surrounds, wraparound indicators, longer bumper end caps and multifunction rear lights incorporating fog, indicator, reversing and side lights for the panel van. This facelift did not commonly result in a new "Mark" number.

The Mark II was available in 6 body styles: Van, Kombi, Chassis Cab, Parcel Van, Bus and Crewbus all available in short-wheelbase (2690 mm) and long-wheelbase (3000 mm) versions. A selection of 5 engines was available: 1.6-litre OHC Petrol, 1.6-litre OHV Petrol (Kent), 2.0-litre OHC Petrol, 2.0-litre OHC Petrol (Economy) and 2.4-litre Diesel. On top of this were 32 door combinations, 6 axle ratios and options for 12 – 17 interior seats. All of these were available in any combination when purchased with Ford's highly customizable custom plan. At the time this gave the business sector an unprecedented amount of flexibility, which was a major factor in the vehicles' ultimate success.

In 1981, for mainland European market only, the Transit Clubmobil was introduced by the Hymer company. This was fitted with a 1.6 / 2.0 OHC engine, and featured a custom interior – captain style swivel seats in velour, pile carpet, motorsport steering wheel, unique Ronal 14" alloy wheels, unique side windows, folding back seat, luggage box, unique front spoiler, tinted glass, power assisted steering, spare wheel carrier and rear door ladder. In 3 years of production 150 were produced and less than 20 are thought to still exist.

In late 1982 the well-equipped Transit Ghia was introduced to some markets, only as a nine-seater bus. This offered a velour interior, full carpeting, tinted windows, and sunroof. Externally it can be identified by chrome dog-dish hubcaps and extra lamps in the grille.

In 1982 a four-wheel drive version was added to the German market, called the SIRA-Ford Transit. This was developed together with Rau GmbH, a Ford dealer in Stuttgart. "SIRA" combines "Sinpar" and "Rau" because Rau was the agent for French four-wheel-drive specialist Sinpar in Germany, Austria, and Switzerland. The SIRA Transit used a Sinpar transfer case and other parts, and was available with the 2-liter petrol four or the 2.4-liter Diesel, on either wheelbase. The 4x4 Transit was later offered in other markets as well.

Second generation (1986)

Pre-facelift (1986) 

Codenamed VE6, the second generation Transit platform appeared in January 1986 and was notable for its all-new bodyshell which was of "one-box" design (i.e. the windscreen and bonnet are at close to the same angle), and the front suspension was changed to a fully independent configuration on SWB versions. Initially fitted with Chubb AVA locks, Tibbe barrels were fitted soon after. The engine range was carried over largely unchanged from the last of the 1978–1985 Mk.1 facelift model, although in 1989 the high-performance 3.0 Essex V6 petrol was replaced by the Cologne 2.9 EFI V6, mainly because of emissions regulations as the Essex V6 design was nearly 25 years old by then and still used a carburettor. The third generation Transit was developed under the "Triton" code name.

A subtle facelift in 1992 saw the fully independent front suspension adopted across the range, whilst a redesigned floor plan allowed the use of single, rather than paired, rear wheels on the LWB derivative, further increasing payload—these models are identifiable by the slightly more rounded front headlamps. In Australia, the third generation Transit did not go on sale until March 1994, after a 13-year absence from that market.

Facelift (1994) 

A major facelift to the Transit in 1994 gave the Transit a new nose and dashboard, along with the 2.0 L DOHC 8-valve engine as found in the 1994 to 1998 Ford Scorpio. It is similar to the earlier Sierra DOHC unit but without the distributor and uses the updated OBD II-compliant EEC-V level engine control unit. Some of Ford's 16-valve engines, such as those found in the Scorpio, Escort RS2000 and Galaxy were also based on this block. At the same time air conditioning, electric windows, central locking, electric mirrors and airbags were all made available as optional extras.

In 1994, a campervan conversion produced by Auto-Sleepers converted in Willersey, Gloucestershire, known as the Auto-Sleepers Duetto was available. It was available with the high-top roof.

For the 30th anniversary of the Transit in 1995 Ford released a limited edition model called the Transit Hallmark. Six hundred were made and were available in three colours with 200 being made in each.

In Europe the VE83 Transit was available up to 2000, but in Vietnam it was built up to 2003 when it was exchanged in June for the new generation.

Chinese production 

Introduced in 2006, the Ford Transit VJX6541DK-M is a license-built version of the Transit assembled by Jiangling Motors (JMC) in Nanchang. Produced solely for the Chinese domestic market, it was derived from the second-generation VE6/VE83/VE94 platform. Over its Ford predecessor produced from 1986 to 2000, JMC made 70 major updates to the design. The exterior was distinguished by revision to the front fascia, including larger front headlamps and a redesigned grille and front bumper. The interior saw several ergonomic improvements, along with the standardization of power windows. ABS was offered as an option.

Sharing its underpinnings with the second-generation Transit, the JMC-built Transit differed substantially in its powertrain configuration.  In place of Ford produced engines, the model line used a 92 kW Mitsubishi-produced 2.4L inline-4.  Two Isuzu-produced 2.8L inline-4 diesels were offered; a naturally aspirated version offering 67.6 kW-68 kW and a turbocharged, intercooled version, offering 80–85 kW.

In 2008, Ford commenced sales of the V347/V348 Transit in China alongside its JMC-produced counterpart, branded the Ford-produced van as the New Transit and the JMC van as the Transit Classic. Between the two manufacturers, a combined 210,000 examples of both generations were sold in China; in 2012, Ford expanded operations, allowing production capacity to expand to 300,000 vehicles. In January 2010, the Toyota recalls affected the Transit Classic, as Ford/JMC utilized the same supplier of accelerator pedals (CTS Corporation), suspecting the units were defective and posed a risk of unintended acceleration. Approximately 1600 Ford Transit Classics in China were affected by the recall.

JMC Teshun 

Starting from May 2017, Jiangling Motors replaced the license-built Ford Transit with the JMC Teshun range of vans.  While sharing much of its body with its predecessor, the Teshun underwent a redesign of the front fascia with a larger front bumper and grille. The interior underwent an update to the dashboard, along with the introduction of a front bench seating configuration.

Retaining the VE83 platform of the second-generation Transit, the gasoline Teshun is offered with a Mitsubishi-produced 136 hp(200N·m) 2.4L inline-4 (Engine code: 4G69S4N) and the diesel Teshun offered with an Jiangling-produced 116 hp(285N·m) 2.8L Turbo-diesel inline-4 (Engine code: JX493ZLQ, essentially a modified version of the Isuzu 4JB1 engine); both engines are paired with a 5-speed manual transmission.

Facelift (2021) 
In August 2021, a facelift of Teshun was unveiled, updates include a redesign of the front fascia, grille, headlamps, and front bumper. The rear of the car has not changed. In terms of power, the 2.4-liter gasoline engine was removed. The original 2.8L turbo-diesel inline-4 engine has been upgraded to increase the output to 122 hp (300N·m).

Third generation (2000)

Pre-facelift (2000) 
The Transit, introduced in July 2000, was the third all-new design, and borrowed styling cues from Ford's "New Edge" designs, like the Focus and Ka. Developed by Ford in the United States, the main innovation is that it is available in either front- or rear-wheel drive. Ford nomenclature makes this the V184 (rear-wheel-drive) or V185 (front-wheel-drive) model. This model features the "Puma"-type Duratorq turbo diesel engine also used in the 2000 Mondeo and Jaguar X-Type, with the petrol versions moving up to the 2.3 L 16-Valve edition of the straight-4 engine. A demonstration of this model's speed with the smallest panel van body, highest output 136PS 2.4 Duratorq turbo-diesel engine and optional 6-speed manual gearbox was shown in series 6 of Top Gear in 2005, where German race driver Sabine Schmitz attempted to drive it around the Nürburgring in under ten minutes, matching Jeremy Clarkson's time in a turbodiesel Jaguar S-Type; after weight reduction and aerodynamic modifications, she was only just unsuccessful, marking her fastest lap at 10m 8s.

This version won the International Van of the Year 2001.

The Durashift EST automatic transmission (optional on all rear-wheel-drive models) features controls mounted on the dashboard, a specially adapted manual mode, tow-haul mode, economy mode and winter mode. This is known as the ASM (automatically shifting manual) system in the Australian market.

2002 saw the introduction of the first High Pressure Common Rail diesel engine in the Transit, with the launch of the  HPCR 2.0-litre in the FWD. Production of the van started at the new Ford-Otosan plant in Kocaeli, Turkey which saw the end of all production at the Genk, Belgium plant which had been producing Transits since 1965. This coincided with the introduction of the Transit Connect (also produced in Kocaeli), a smaller panel van based on the C170 (Focus) platform and aimed at replacing the older Escort and Fiesta based models. Despite the name, the Connect has no engineering commonality with the full-size Transit.

2003 saw a new instrument cluster with a digital odometer.

2004 saw the launch of the first RWD HPCR, the  2.4-litre variant that also introduced the 6-speed MT-82 RWD manual gearbox.

The five millionth Transit rolled off the Southampton line on Monday, 18 July 2005 and was donated to an English charity.

Facelift (2006) 

The third-generation Transit received a facelift to the body, introduced in July 2006, including new front and rear lights, a new front end and a new interior featuring the gearstick on the dashboard and Ford's new corporate radio design. Besides the styling changes, the powertrains were revised. The old petrol engine was replaced with one from the Ford Ranger, the front-wheel-drive diesel went from 2.0 to 2.2 litres capacity, and all diesel engines gained high-pressure common rail (TDCi) systems. The powertrains were changed to meet new emissions legislation. Additionally, the facelift introduced CAN bus electronics to the Transit for the first time. The new version (Ford nomenclature V347 for front-wheel drive and V348 for rear-wheel drive) won International Van of the Year for 2007 despite tough competition from several all-new rivals. This Transit arrived in Mexico to replace the Freestar after the 2007 model year. This was the first Transit with a five-cylinder engine available (in the 3.2L 200PS version).

Mid-2006 saw the launch of the "Sport Van", a production van featuring the  engine with additional styling parts, "Le Mans" stripes and 18-inch alloy wheels.

Late-2007 saw the launch of the  engine for front-wheel-drives (replacing the 130 PS) complete with the VMT6 6-speed manual transaxle to cope with the extra power.

In late 2008, the "coated Diesel Particulate Filter" (cDPF)—designed to meet higher emission standards than the current Euro IV requirement—was introduced as an option on all diesel engines. Production ended in 2013, with the Southampton plant closing down making this generation the last of the British built Transits, but returned in China in two modified forms.

Engines
 2.2 L Diesel, ; 2006–2014
 2.2 L Diesel, ; 2006–2008
 2.2 L Diesel, ; 2008–2014
 2.2 L Diesel, ; 2006–2007
 2.2 L Diesel, ; 2007–2014
 2.4 L Diesel, ; 2006–2014
 2.4 L Diesel, ; 2006–2014
 2.4 L Diesel, ; 2006–2014
 3.2 L Diesel, ; 2007–2014
 2.3 L Petrol, ; 2006–2014

XXL
To celebrate the Transit's status as International Van of the Year 2007, Ford built a stretch limousine style van – the Transit XXL. It is a unique special that is the most expensive Transit ever made.

SuperSportVan 
The Ford Transit SuperSportVan was a one-off, high-performance version of the third-gen Transit built by Ford Europe. It uses a 3.2L turbocharged Duratorq I5, producing 198 horsepower, borrowed from a larger Transit model, mated to a 6-speed transmission.

Chinese market 

The third-generation Ford Transit commenced production in China in 2008 for the 2009 model year. Engine choices consisted the 2.2-litre turbo diesel, a 2.3-litre petrol for 2009 models and a 2.4-litre turbo diesel. The Transit in China was given a facelift for the 2013 model year onwards with new headlights and taillights. As of 2019, the 2.2-litre turbo diesel engine and 6 speed manual gearbox is standard across the range.

2021 Ford Transit Pro
During the 2020 Beijing Auto Show, a facelift named the Ford Transit Pro was unveiled featuring another facelift on the third-generation Ford Transit for the 2021 model year. The facelift features a redesigned front end and restyled tail lamps. The facelift also features updated powertrain to fulfill the National Standard VI emissions standard in China. The updated engine is a 2.2 liter diesel engine producing 190 hp and 360N·m mated to a 6-speed manual transmission.

This design is also made and sold in Vietnam as the Ford Transit as of 2022. It is powered by a 2.2 liter turbodiesel engine producing 136 hp mated to a 6-speed manual transmission.

2022 JMC Fushun 
In mid-2022, Jiangling Motors released the JMC Fushun based on the Transit Pro. According to the official data, the model will be equipped with a 2.0L inline-4 turbo-diesel engine (engine code: JX4D20A6H, an engine modified by the Ford ZSD-420 engine) output of 146 hp (355N· m). Paired with a 6-speed manual transmission.

Fourth generation (2014) 
The fourth-generation Transit was launched in January 2013 at the 2013 North American (Detroit) International Auto Show.  In contrast to the previous generation developed in the United States (but never sold there), the fourth-generation Transit was co-designed by Ford of Europe and Ford in North America.  After entering production for worldwide sale in 2013, the Transit entered sale in North America in 2014 as an early 2015 model.

The fourth-generation Transit was the first version to be offered for sale in the United States and Canada, replacing the E-Series passenger cargo and passenger van (the E-Series remains in production as a cutaway/chassis cab).  While produced since 1965 (nearly as long as the Mustang), previous generations of the Transit were excluded from North America to avoid model overlap with the Econoline/E-Series.

The introduction of the fourth generation saw a transition of the Transit nameplate into a commercially oriented sub-brand of Ford.  To supplement its namesake vehicle and the Transit Connect MPV, Ford spun off the previous front-wheel drive Transit into its own model line, the Transit Custom (sized between the Transit Connect and Transit), with the Fiesta-based Transit Courier introduced in 2014 as the smallest model of the product range.  The namesake of the model line, the fourth-generation Transit is marketed against the Chevrolet Express/GMC Savana, Mercedes-Benz Sprinter, Fiat Ducato (and its variants), and the Volkswagen Crafter in markets worldwide.

Chassis 

The fourth-generation Transit is offered in a rear-wheel drive powertrain layout; the front-wheel drive version of the previous generation has been replaced by the Transit Custom.  The Transit van is offered in two wheelbases (129.9 inches and 147.6 inches) while the chassis cab/cutaway van is offered in three wheelbases (138 inches, 155.7, and 178 inches).  As with previous-generation vans, extended-wheelbase vans were produced with either single or dual rear-wheel axles (the latter, a first for North America, which previously reserved the design for chassis/cutaway cabs).

In a major change from the E-Series, the Transit uses a unibody chassis design instead of a separate frame; while no longer using a separate chassis, the high use of boron steel allowed for increase in payload capacity of up to 600 pounds (over a similar-configuration E-Series).  The long-running Twin I-Beams of the E-Series were retired, as the fourth-generation Transit uses MacPherson struts for the front suspension; the live rear axle is leaf-sprung.  The model line is fitted with four-wheel disc brakes.

Powertrain 
For its worldwide introduction in 2013, the fourth-generation Transit inherited the Duratorq diesel engines from the previous generation, shared with the Ranger and Mondeo.  A 2.0L inline-4 was introduced (for China), shared with the 2.2L and 2.4L inline-4s (the former, for Europe and Australia; the latter, Europe); the largest engine was a 3.2L inline-5 (for markets outside South America).  Gasoline engines were also offered, including a 2.0L Ecoboost inline-4 (for China) and a 2.3L Duratec inline-4.

For production in the Americas, the Transit was offered with higher-displacement gasoline engines (shared with the F-Series).  A 275 hp 3.7L V6 was the standard engine in North America, with a 310 hp 3.5L twin-turbo EcoBoost V6 offered in both North and South America; the 185 hp 3.2L inline-5 was offered beginning in 2015 (renamed as a Powerstroke diesel).  From 2015 to 2019, all engines were paired to a 6-speed automatic transmission, replaced by a 10-speed automatic for 2020.

As an option through Ford, the 3.7L engine can be converted to run on compressed natural gas (CNG) or liquefied petroleum gas (propane).

Body configuration
In a design shift, the Transit (and Transit Custom) moved from the New Edge styling of the previous generation to the Kinetic design language; the interior was influenced by the third-generation Ford Focus.  The fourth-generation Transit as both a van and as a chassis cab/cutaway cab; the pickup truck of the previous generation has been discontinued.  The van is offered in three different roof lengths and three different roof heights.

In most worldwide markets, the Transit passenger van is primarily marketed under the Ford Tourneo name, with Ford using the Transit name for both cargo and passenger vans in the United States and Canada.  In line with other Ford trucks in North America, the Transit is marketed in XL and XLT trims.  In line with the F-Series trucks (and its E-Series predecessor), in North America, the Transit is marketed in 150/250/350 (and 350HD) payload series, determined by wheelbase, body length, and roof height.

As with the E-Series and the previous generation Transit, the model line serves as the basis for multiple commercial vehicles, including ambulances, buses, and recreational vehicles.

2020 update

For 2020 production, the Ford Transit underwent a mid-cycle model revision, distinguished by an update of the front fascia and dashboard.  In both Otosan and Claycomo-produced examples, the powertrain saw several updates.  For North America, a naturally-aspirated 275 hp 3.5L V6 with port and direct injection replaced the 3.7L V6; the 3.5L twin-turbo V6 remained an option.  For markets outside the Americas, the four Duratorq diesel engines were replaced by a single 2.0L EcoBlue inline-4 turbodiesel (shared with the Ranger outside of North America).  Offered in multiple power outputs (105, 130, 170, 185 PS), the EcoBlue engine is also offered with a mild-hybrid option (with the 130 PS engine).  Initially intended for North American sale (alongside the Transit Connect), the EcoBlue option was dropped shortly before its introduction.

All-wheel drive is again an option for the model line.  A new trim level marketed as Transit Trail was also made available for the Transit and Transit Custom. It features a Quaife locking differential and design elements of the North-American market Ford F-150 Raptor. A crew van body style was introduced as a new option; known as a double cab in Europe, the design combines the design of a passenger and cargo van, offering 5-passenger seating and a large rear cargo space.  The 2020 Transit also adopted power-sliding doors and dual sliding doors (for cargo vans) as options.

E-Transit 

In November 2020, Ford announced the 2022 E-Transit battery electric cargo van; key specifications include a  /  maximum cargo capacity, 68 kWh (usable capacity) battery and up to  range, based on the US EPA Multi-Cycle Test (MCT) procedure. The E-Transit began production at Ford's Kansas City Assembly Plant in November 2021. The first E-Transits were delivered to American customers in February 2022; according to Ford, they had received more than 10,000 orders for the E-Transit from 300 commercial fleets. E-Transit production for the European market began at Otosan in April 2022 to fill orders totaling more than 5,000 vehicles.

The E-Transit has a unique chassis to accommodate the traction battery between the frame rails, but is fitted with the same bodies as the conventional Transit. Under the bonnet, Ford have fitted cooling pumps for the high-voltage traction battery and motor, along with cabin climate control equipment and other electrical gear, including the DC-DC converter. Externally, the E-Transit can be distinguished by its rear axle, which carries the traction motor and has an independent suspension using semi-trailing arms and coil springs, rather than the live axle and leaf springs of the conventional Transit.

The liquid-cooled traction battery is sourced from the Mustang Mach-E; usable capacity is 68 kW-hr with a gross capacity of 77 kW-hr. Maximum charging speeds are 11.3 kW (AC) or 115 kW (DC). The Combined Charging System vehicle inlet is on the front of the car, below the manufacturer's emblem. When equipped with the Pro Power Onboard option, the E-Transit can supply up to 2.4 kW of electrical power for tools and accessories through conventional AC outlets.

There are 25 combinations of height (2 choices), wheelbase (3), and gross vehicle weight rating (3) in the UK.

What Car? named the E-Transit its Van of the Year in 2022.

Transit Trail
The Ford Transit Trail is an upcoming off-road motorhome version of the van and comes with a  twin-turbo V6 engine and all-wheel drive.

Transit Custom 

Replacing the previous front-wheel drive Transit/Tourneo, the Ford Transit Custom is a mid-size cargo and passenger van.  Competing against the Mercedes-Benz Vito/Viano, Peugeot Expert, Renault Trafic and Volkswagen Transporter, the Custom is offered in two body lengths and two roof heights.  Offered in most worldwide markets, the Transit Custom is not currently sold in the United States and Canada; it is sold in Mexico (where the predecessor front-wheel drive Transit replaced the Freestar minivan).

For 2018 production, the model line received an exterior update, distinguished by a new grille (in line with the larger Transit); the interior received a new dashboard (styled in line with the Fiesta).

Assembly 
Worldwide production of the fourth-generation Transit is sourced from two Ford facilities.  All Transit production for Europe and Asia is sourced from Ford Otosan in Kocaeli Province, Turkey; this factory provides a percentage of global exports.  North American and South American production is primarily sourced from Kansas City Assembly in Claycomo, Missouri; production at the Kansas City Assembly Plant began on 30 April 2014.

In North America, the model line was launched as a 2015 model, adopting the Transit name for both cargo and passenger vans (rather than using the Tourneo name used in other markets for passenger vans).

Sales

Variants

County 4×4 

A handful of companies offered four-wheel-drive conversions, such as County Tractors of Knighton in Powys, Wales, UK who converted vans on behalf of Ford as a Special Vehicle Operations factory option. The first Transit County models were based on the Mk2 Transit model, both long and short wheelbase. The conversion used a Dana 44F front axle and a NP208 transfer box, both lifted from the Ford Bronco, coupled to the regular Transit engine, gearbox and rear axle using three custom propshafts. The Transit rear axle was retained, mounted to a rear subframe or 'lift cradle' to give the extra ride height. Other modifications were 16-inch wheel rims, locking front hubs, a heavy-duty steering box and 305 mm diameter front brake discs.

With the introduction of the Mk3 Transit in 1986 came the next generation of the County 4×4. This would prove to be a very popular and successful version of the County Transit 4×4, and the last to use the Dana beam axle layout. Later County 4×4 models switched to using an independent front suspension setup which was inherently more complex in design than the earlier beam axle models. Later panel vans also lost the twin-wheel rear axle that had been fitted on earlier LWB versions.

Mainly used by utility companies such as National Grid (UK), the Ministry of Defence (UK), and by mountain rescue teams, the Transit County 4×4 proved to be a capable vehicle both on and off-road, with the ability to carry both crew and equipment just about anywhere.

Design and supply of drivetrain components for County 4×4 models passed to Countytrac, a division of M.J. Allen Ltd, who are still involved in the development of the latest Mk7 AWD Transit and Connect models.

Tourneo 

Introduced as part of the 1995 redesign of the Transit, the Tourneo is a Transit-based 8 or 9-seat minibus, but over the years has become increasingly better trimmed up to the point where it can almost be classified as a large MPV. Featuring back seats and back windows similar to a minivan, the Tourneo is also considered an executive transport vehicle and is often supplied with alloy wheels. Since its introduction, the Tourneo has followed the same development cycle as the Transit; both versions receive updates at the same time.

A smaller minivan version of the Tourneo was introduced in 2002; branded the Tourneo Connect, it was based on the Transit Connect mini MPV.

The version based on the fourth generation Transit is marketed as the Ford Tourneo Custom, and from 2019 has a plug-in hybrid engine option.

References

External links 

 Official Australia Ford All-new Transit website
 UK Ford Transit website
 USA Ford Transit website

Transit
Transit
All-wheel-drive vehicles
Cars of Turkey
Flexible-fuel vehicles
Front-wheel-drive vehicles
Minibuses
Motor vehicles manufactured in the United States
Police vehicles
Rear-wheel-drive vehicles
Road vehicles manufactured in the United Kingdom
School bus chassis
Vans
Vehicles introduced in 1965